Kakustha may refer to:

 Kakutstha, a legendary king of India
 Kakusthavarma, a 5th-century Indian king from the Kadamba dynasty
 Kakustha (Gurjara-Pratihara dynasty), an 8th-century Indian king